Lonesome Love is the second studio album by American country artist Jean Shepard. The album was released in December 1958 on Capitol Records and was produced by Ken Nelson. It was another album released by another central theme.

Background and content 
Lonesome Love was recorded at the Bradley Film and Recording Studio in Nashville, Tennessee and was recorded in five separate sessions between May 13 and May 17, 1958. This was unlike Shepard's last release Songs of a Love Affair, which was recorded at the Capitol Recording Studio in Hollywood, California. The album contained twelve tracks and consisted of a series of cover versions of country songs by other music artists. Like her previous release, Lonesome Love centered on a single theme, which was lonely love, as said in the album's title. Songs such as Harlan Howard's "Thief in the Night" and "You're Telling Me Sweet Lies Again" exemplified the major theme. It included a remake of Hank Williams' Top 10 single "You Win Again", Eddy Arnold's "I'll Hold You in My Heart", and "I Love You Because", which had been recorded both by Leon Payne and Elvis Presley. It also included songs written by Wynn Stewart and Merle Travis. The album included several members of The Nashville A-Team playing in the background such as Buddy Harman on drums and Grady Martin on guitar.

Release 
Lonesome Love was released as Jean Shepard's second studio album in December 1958 on Capitol Records. The album was originally issued as an LP record, which contained six songs on each side of the record. Unlike her previous release, Lonesome Love did not spawn any singles upon its original release nor did it in years to come. The album did not chart any Billboard Magazine albums list upon its release as well. Lonesome Love was reviewed by Allmusic, who gave the release four out of five stars, without a written review provided.

Track listing 
Side one
"Thief in the Night" – (Harlan Howard)
"I'll Hold You in My Heart" – (Eddy Arnold, Vic McAlpin, Howard Horton)
"The Weak and the Strong" – (Red Hayes)
"You'd Better Go" – (Howard, Wynn Stewart)
"Sweet Temptation" – (Cliffie Stone, Merle Travis)
"I'll Never Be Free" – (Bennie Benjamin, George David Weiss)

Side two
"You Win Again" – (Hank Williams)
"I Hate Myself" – (E.M. Vandall)
"You're Telling Me Sweet Lies Again" – (Gertrude Cox, Jack Rhodes)
"Memory" – (Cox)
"You Can't Break the Chains of Love" – (Lew Porter, Jimmy Wakely, Fred Tableporter)
"I Love You Because" – (Leon Payne)

Personnel 
 Floyd Cramer – piano
 Ray Edenton – rhythm guitar
 Buddy Harman – drums
 Roy Huskey Jr. – bass
 Walter Haynes – steel guitar
 Grady Martin – guitar
 Jean Shepard – lead vocals

References 

1958 albums
Jean Shepard albums
Albums produced by Ken Nelson (United States record producer)
Capitol Records albums